The Little River is a  tributary of the Oconee River in the U.S. state of Georgia. It rises in Walton County near the city of Social Circle and flows southeast to join the Oconee River in Lake Sinclair.

See also 
 
 
 List of rivers of Georgia

References

External links 

USGS Hydrologic Unit Map - State of Georgia (1974)

Rivers of Georgia (U.S. state)
Rivers of Walton County, Georgia
Rivers of Newton County, Georgia
Rivers of Morgan County, Georgia
Rivers of Putnam County, Georgia